The 2014 East Asian Judo Championships was contested in seven weight classes, seven each for men and women. Also participated nations contested in men's and women's team competitions.

This competition was held in Ulaanbaatar, Mongolia, 9 and 10 May.

Medals table

Team competition

Men

Women

Participated nations

External links
 
 Judo Union of Asia
 Results - infomongolia.com

East Asian Judo Championships
Asian Championships, East
Judo
East Asian 2014
Judo Asian Championships, East
Judo 2014 Asian Championships, East
Judo 2014 Asian Championships, East
Judo Championships, East